In mathematics, more specifically in the study of dynamical systems and differential equations, a Liénard equation is a second order differential equation, named after the French physicist Alfred-Marie Liénard.

During the development of radio and vacuum tube technology, Liénard equations were intensely studied as they can be used to model oscillating circuits. Under certain additional assumptions Liénard's theorem guarantees the uniqueness and existence of a limit cycle for such a system. A Liénard system with piecewise-linear functions can also contain homoclinic orbits.

Definition

Let f and g be two continuously differentiable functions on R, with g an odd function and f an even function. Then the second order ordinary differential equation of the form

is called the Liénard equation.

Liénard system

The equation can be transformed into an equivalent two-dimensional system of ordinary differential equations. We define 

 
 
then

is called a Liénard system.

Alternatively, since the Liénard equation itself is also an autonomous differential equation, the substitution  leads the Liénard equation to become a first order differential equation:

which belongs to Abel equation of the second kind.

Example

The Van der Pol oscillator

is a Liénard equation. The solution of a Van der Pol oscillator has a limit cycle. Such cycle has a solution of a Liénard equation with negative  at small  and positive  otherwise. The Van der Pol equation has no exact, analytic solution. Such solution for a limit cycle exists if  is a constant piece-wise function.

Liénard's theorem

A Liénard system has a unique and stable limit cycle surrounding the origin if it satisfies the following additional properties:
 g(x) > 0 for all x > 0;
 
 F(x) has exactly one positive root at some value p, where F(x) < 0 for 0 < x < p and F(x) > 0 and monotonic for x > p.

See also
Autonomous differential equation
Abel equation of the second kind
Biryukov equation

Footnotes

External links
 
 

Dynamical systems
Differential equations
Theorems in dynamical systems